Magomed Ruslanovich Yakuyev (born 7 June 2004) is a Russian football player. He plays for FC Akhmat Grozny.

Club career
He made his debut for FC Akhmat Grozny on 19 October 2022 in a Russian Cup game against FC Orenburg.

Career statistics

References

External links
 
 
 
 

200 births
People from Achkhoy-Martanovsky District
Living people
Russian footballers
Association football midfielders
FC Akhmat Grozny players